Casino Fandango is a hotel and casino located in Carson City, Nevada. It has  of gaming space. It is owned and operated by Carson Gaming LLC.

It opened on July 31, 2003.

In 2010, the Casino Fandango won the award for the Premier Entertainment Destination in Carson City by the Nevada Appeal Readers' Choice awards. The complex owned by the Casino Fandango includes a digital movie theater, five restaurants (including a buffet), four bars, a performance stage, a three-story parking garage, and the casino itself. Adjacent to the complex is a Marriott International Courtyard Hotel. The casino includes a large race and sports book owned by William Hill. 

As of December 31, 2018, Casino Fandango ceased offering pari-mutuel wagering, leaving nearby Bodines as the only remaining casino for off-track betting in Carson City.

References

External links
 

2003 establishments in Nevada
Casinos completed in 2003
Casinos in Carson City, Nevada